The 1977–78 UCLA Bruins men's basketball team represented the University of California, Los Angeles in the 1977–78 NCAA Division I men's basketball season.  Gary Cunningham, who would be the highest winning percentage coach of all time at UCLA, began his first of two years. The Bruins started the season ranked 6th in the nation (AP Poll). The Bruins started the season 4–0 before losing at Notre Dame.  UCLA's team finished 1st in the Pac-8 regular season. They went undefeated in conference play for the first time since John Wooden's 1972–73 team in the last Pac-8 year, as the conference would add the two Arizona universities, becoming the Pac-10. UCLA participated the NCAA tournament where they lost to Arkansas.

Starting lineup

Roster

Schedule

|-
!colspan=9 style=|Regular Season

|-
!colspan=12 style="background:#;"| NCAA Tournament

Source

References

UCLA Bruins men's basketball seasons
Ucla
Ucla
UCLA
UCLA